The Campeonato Sul-Mato-Grossense Série B is the second level of football league of the state of Mato Grosso do Sul, Brazil.

Format

As in any other Brazilian soccer championship, the format can change every year.

List of champions

Notes
Novo and Novoperário are the same club.
Operário AC as moved from Dourados to Caarapó.

Titles by team

Teams in bold stills active.

By city

References